Pedro Costa (born 11 May 1996) is a Portuguese sailor. He competed in the 2020 Summer Olympics.

Costa placed second in the 2021 470 World Championships with Diogo Costa, qualifying the pair for the 2020 Olympics.

References

1996 births
Living people
Sailors at the 2020 Summer Olympics – 470
Portuguese male sailors (sport)
Olympic sailors of Portugal